LGK could refer to:

 Langkawi International Airport, Malaysia; IATA airport code LGK
 Longbeck railway station, England; National Rail station code LGK